Mahesh Basnet ( is a Nepalese politician, belonging to CPN (UML) currently serving as the member of the 2nd Federal Parliament of Nepal. In the 2022 Nepalese general election, he won the election from Ilam 1.

References 

Nepal MPs 2022–present
Communist Party of Nepal (Unified Marxist–Leninist) politicians
1960 births
Living people